United Nations Security Council resolution 675, adopted unanimously on 5 November 1990, after recalling resolutions 637 (1989) and 644 (1989), the Council endorsed a report by the Secretary-General and decided to extend the mandate of the United Nations Observer Group in Central America for a further six months until 7 May 1991.

The resolution noted the need to remain vigilant of the financial costs of the Observer Group, given the increased demand on United Nations peacekeeping forces. It also requested the Secretary-General to report back before the end of the current mandate on all aspects of the Observer Group.

See also
 History of Central America
 History of Nicaragua
 List of United Nations Security Council Resolutions 601 to 700 (1987–1991)

References
Text of the Resolution at undocs.org

External links
 

 0675
History of Central America
Politics of Central America
History of Nicaragua
1990 in Nicaragua
 0675
November 1990 events